Common Market is the self-titled debut album from Seattle-based hip-hop duo Common Market consisting of rapper RA Scion and DJ/producer Sabzi. The album was fully produced by Sabzi, who is also a member of another Seattle hip-hop group, Blue Scholars.

Release 
The album was initially released February 13, 2005 independently. Following the well received local response, the album caught the attention of KRS-One, who would expose Common Market to a wider audience when KRS-One brought them on the Temple of Hip-hop tour. One year later, the album was re-released October 17 on Massline Media. The re-release adds one bonus track and revised cover art. The bonus track on the re-released version of the album is a remixed version of a Blue Scholars song from their 2005 The Long March EP.  It features Geologic and Gabriel Teodros.

Influences 

"G'Dang Diggy" is a reference to the New York Rap Battle involving KRS-One of Boogie Down Productions.

Track listing

References

External links 
 Common Market (album) at Bandcamp
 Common Market (album) at Discogs

Common Market (hip hop group) albums
2006 albums